Barbara von Schierstädt (born 5 March 1974) is a German television presenter, actress and singer.

Early life
Schöneberger is the only child of clarinet player Hans Schöneberger and his wife Annemarie. She studied sociology, art history and communication studies in Augsburg.

Career

Television
Since 1999, Schöneberger has hosted several shows on German television, including Die Schöneberger Show and Blondes Gift ("Blond Poison"), for which she received a Grimme Award nomination. She has also acted in a number of TV movies and hosted such award ceremonies as the Echo Award 2009.

Music

In 2007, Schöneberger released her first studio album, Jetzt singt sie auch noch! ("Now she's singing too!"). Her second album, Nochmal, nur anders ("Again, only different"), followed in 2009. In 2014 she announced her first Music Tour in Germany. On 25 October 2013, Schöneberger's third album, Bekannt aus Funk und Fernsehen ("known from radio and television"), was released, which thematically revolves around her life between a television woman and a housewife, and which she also presented on stage in 2014.

On 11 May 2018, Schöneberger's fourth album Eine Frau gibt Auskunft ("A woman gives information") was released, which thematically deals with different perspectives of women in each song and pokes fun at the men's world critically, but with a wink.

Radio
In October 2018, a 24-hour radio program focused on her started, Barba Radio.

Personal life
Schöneberger lives in Berlin with her second husband Maximilian von Schierstädt and has a son and a daughter. She volunteers for the German bone marrow donor database and has been moderating the DKMS-Dreamball several times. In 2009, she was awarded the Douglas Hope Carrier Prize for her commitment. She is also, together with her TV presenter colleague Oliver Welke, long-time ambassador for the international children's aid organization terre des hommes.

Discography

Studio albums

Honors

 2002: Nomination for the German Television Award (Deutscher Fernsehpreis)
 2003: Nomination for the Adolf Grimme Prize in the entertainment / special category for "the independent, playful handling of the conventions of a talk show in the Blondes Gift series "
 2007: German Comedy Award as a member of the Frei Schnauze XXL ensemble (Best Comedy Show)
 2015: Federal Cross of Merit on the ribbon of the Order of Merit of the Federal Republic of Germany for the commitment as an ambassador for the relief organization terre des hommes for the rights of children in need
 2016: German Television Award for the moderation of Die 2 - Gottschalk & Jauch against ALL
 2016: Romy in the Show / Entertainment category
 2016: Goldene Henne in the category audience award entertainment
 2019: Horizont Award Woman of the Year in the Media category

References

External links

Official website 

1974 births
German television talk show hosts
German  women singer-songwriters
Living people
Musicians from Munich
21st-century German women singers
German actresses
German game show hosts
German women television presenters
German television personalities
ARD (broadcaster) people
Norddeutscher Rundfunk people
RTL Group people
ZDF people
Television people from Munich
Recipients of the Cross of the Order of Merit of the Federal Republic of Germany